Daeyeon High School is a high school in Nam-gu, Busan Metropolitan City, South Korea. It was established in 1988. The current principal is Kim Young Do (김영도). The school was established by edict of Yang Yong-chi on April 29, 1986, and opened its doors on March 5, 1988.

See also
Education in South Korea

References

External links
 

Education in Busan
High schools in South Korea
Educational institutions established in 1988
1988 establishments in South Korea